Into the Macabre is the debut album of the Italian extreme metal band Necrodeath.

Track listing
"...Agony / The Flag Of The Inverted Cross" - 3:36 
"At The Mountains Of Madness" - 4:28
"Sauthenerom" - 4:07
"Mater Tenebrarum" - 4:32
"Necrosadist" - 3:47
"Internal Decay" - 4:23
"Graveyard Of The Innocents" - 3:35
"The Undead / Agony" (Reprise) - 4:43

Credits
Ingo: vocals
Peso: drums
Claudio: guitars
Paolo: bass

References

1987 debut albums
Necrodeath albums
Scarlet Records albums